Sex Therapy: The Session is the fourth studio album by American R&B recording artist Robin Thicke, released December 15, 2009 on Star Trak Entertainment in the United States. Sex Therapy also features guest contributions by Jay-Z, Game, Kid Cudi, Snoop Dogg, Nicki Minaj and Estelle. The album debuted at number 9 on the US Billboard 200 chart, selling 123,000 copies in its first week. Upon its release, Sex Therapy received generally positive reviews from music critics.

Background
Speaking in March 2010 to noted UK R&B writer Pete Lewis – Deputy Editor of the award-winning Blues & Soul – Thicke explained: "I'm always gonna have the influence of Marvin Gaye, Stevie Wonder and Al Green in my music. But with this 'Sex Therapy' album, I also wanted to show my HIP HOP side. I grew up listening to Run DMC and NWA and Biggie and Pac and Jay-Z... So I really wanted to make a record that represented how much that music has influenced me. Plus, because I'd been writing deep and sad songs for a while, I think I was just tired of wallowing in my own self-depression! So, in terms of overall feel, I definitely wanted this album to be lighter on its FEET!"

Release and promotion
There are two different versions of the album.  The regular version is called Sex Therapy: The Session.  The deluxe version, released on the same day, is called Sex Therapy: The Experience and has five additional tracks.  Unlike most other special editions, where the bonus tracks are all at the end, the extra tracks on The Experience are mixed in with the regular Session track listing.

Singles
The album's first single, "Sex Therapy", was released on October 20, 2009. It reached number 54 on the US Billboard Hot 100 and number 1 on the Hot R&B/Hip-Hop Songs chart. The official second single outside of the US is "Rollercoasta" featuring Estelle. The music video was filmed in February 2010. The video premiered on March 19, 2010. The single was released on March 8, 2010.

Other songs
"Meiplé", a collaboration with rapper Jay-Z, was released to iTunes on December 1, 2009 as a promo single prior to the release of the album. It impacted Italian radio in January 2010 and peaked at number No. 63 on the airplay chart. "Shakin' It 4 Daddy" featuring Nicki Minaj was set to be the third US single released from the album but the release was later cancelled. He performed the song numerous times, including on BET's 106 & Park in December 2009 and on the Late Show with David Letterman in February 2010 which led to extreme popularity among both artists. A remix of the song, Shakin' It 4 Daddy" (Manon Dave Remix), was made available for purchase as a digital download on February 8, 2011. "It's in the Mornin featuring Snoop Dogg instead of "Rollercoasta". A music video for the single was shot in March 2010 with The Price Is Right'''s Manuela Arbeláez playing his love interest. The video premiered on May 9, 2010.

Tour
Thicke was added as a supporting act on Alicia Keys' Freedom Tour, which kicked off on February 28, 2010 in Montreal, Quebec, Canada, with stops at Madison Square Garden and Staples Center, performing material from Sex Therapy.

Critical reception

Upon its release, Sex Therapy received generally positive reviews from most music critics, based on an aggregate score of 71/100 from Metacritic. AllMusic writer Andy Kellman gave it 3½ out of 5 stars and praised Thicke's singing, calling his falsetto "one of the best voices in R&B". Entertainment Weeklys Simon Vozick-Levinson gave Sex Therapy a B+ rating and wrote "Thicke takes a few more risks on his fourth album... slinging falsetto boasts and come-ons over futuristic electro-funk backdrops". Associated Content writer Chris A. Sosa gave it an A rating and wrote that it "serves as Thicke's stepping out, finally embracing the simmering sexuality that's always lurked just barely below the surface of his soaring falsetto". Alex Thornton of HipHopDX gave the album 4 out of 5 stars and commended Thicke for his songwriting ability. Elysa Gardner of USA Today gave the album 3 out of 4 stars and wrote that its songs are "better vehicles for Thicke and his collaborators' naughty wit and seductive grooves than they are for his silky croon". Newsdays Glenn Gamboa gave Sex Therapy an A− rating and viewed that Thicke's attempt to incorporate other musical styles "sound as effortless as his Princely falsetto". The Huffington Posts Mike Ragogna wrote favorably of its sexual themes and called the album "a potent mix of r&b and rap with the soulful singer-songwriter channeling Marvin and Smokey on some of the more seductive songs". Jon Caramanica of The New York Times lauded Thicke for dispensing with the "characteristic politesse" of his previous work, while calling it "the best album of his career, and also the most ridiculous".The Washington Posts Allison Stewart described it as "a gooey, goofy, occasionally great, obsessively carnal mix of '70s soul and mid-'00s computerized retro/futurist hip-pop", but perceived an "overemphasis on guest stars and superstar production" and found Thicke's songwriting "awkward". PopMatters writer Tyler Lewis gave Sex Therapy a 6/10 rating and called it "a well-made album", but found its sexually-themed songs "cheeky, not sensual", writing "It is definitely more cartoonish than anything 70s soul men would have released, no matter how great some of the melodies are". Okayplayer writer Kendred Spirit perceived Thicke's departure from his previous work's aesthetic as breaking his "artistic morality", stating "he simply does not sound right over the intrusive synths and fuzzy drum beats of today's pop". Q gave the album 3 out of 5 stars and noted its "Prince-ly fixation with carnal knowledge" as "a touch of the absurd", but stated "Still, it's delivered with panache, thanks to Thicke's versatile pop-soul vocals and some slick production work". Los Angeles Times writer August Brown gave the album 2½ out of 4 stars and wrote "his new randiness adds zip to an always-perfect falsetto". Despite having a mixed response towards its collaborational tracks, Mark Edward Nero of About.com gave it 3½ out of 5 stars and commended Thicke for "expanding his horizons". The A.V. Clubs Joshua Alston gave it a B− rating and called it "admirable", stating "Sex Therapy is certainly not grown, nor particularly sexy, but it's often great, sometimes because of its lover-boy goofiness, other times in spite of it".

Commercial performance
The album debuted at number 9 on the US Billboard 200 and at number 2 on the Top R&B/Hip-Hop Albums, selling 123,000 in the first week of sales, selling at least half more units than his third album, Something Else, which was his first album chart in the top five, peaking at number 3, on the Billboard 200. In its second week, it fell at number 31. In the third week, the album went ten places on the charts, landing at number 21 on the Billboard 200, and then the following week, the album went three places down to number 24, as well as the week after, it went to number 28. The following week, the album re-entered at number 35, due to strong sales and airplay. As of July 2010, the album has sold 440,000 copies in the United States.

Track listing

Charts

Weekly charts

Year-end charts

Release history

References

External links
 Sex Therapy at Discogs
 Sex Therapy'' at Metacritic
 Album Review at About.com

2009 albums
Robin Thicke albums
Albums produced by Dre & Vidal
Albums produced by Jeff Bhasker
Albums produced by Polow da Don
Albums produced by Robin Thicke
Albums produced by Teddy Riley
Albums produced by Toby Gad
Interscope Records albums
Star Trak Entertainment albums